Caner Cavlan (born 5 February 1992) is a Dutch professional footballer who plays as a left back for Turkish club Bandırmaspor. Besides the Netherlands, he has played in Turkey and Austria.

Club career
Cavlan is known for his passing skills. Cavlan also is a free-kick specialist. He made his debut for De Graafschap in the away game versus AZ replacing Sjoerd Overgoor as a second-half substitute. He moved to Heerenveen in summer 2015.

Heerenveen loaned him to Turkish second division side Şanlıurfaspor in January 2017.

On 18 June 2021, he returned to Turkey and signed a two-year contract with Bandırmaspor.

Personal life
Born in the Netherlands, Cavlan is of Turkish descent.

References

External links
 

1992 births
Living people
People from Doetinchem
Footballers from Gelderland
Dutch people of Turkish descent
Association football fullbacks
Dutch footballers
Dutch expatriate footballers
DZC '68 players
De Graafschap players
SC Heerenveen players
Şanlıurfaspor footballers
Boluspor footballers
FC Emmen players
FK Austria Wien players
Bandırmaspor footballers
Eredivisie players
Eerste Divisie players
TFF First League players
Austrian Football Bundesliga players
Expatriate footballers in Austria
Dutch expatriate sportspeople in Austria